Kevin Smith is an American screenwriter, actor, film producer, and director. He came to prominence with the low-budget comedy Clerks (1994), in which he appeared as the character Silent Bob. His first several films were mostly set in his home state of New Jersey, and while not strictly sequential, they frequently feature crossover plot elements, character references, and a shared canon described by fans as the "View Askewniverse"—named after his production company View Askew Productions, which he co-founded with Scott Mosier.

Smith also directed and produced films such as the buddy cop action comedy Cop Out, as well as the thriller Red State. Outside of film, Smith has worked in various capacities on several television series.

Smith also participates in Q&A sessions that have routinely been filmed for DVD release, beginning with An Evening with Kevin Smith.

Film

Short films

Additional writing credits

Executive producer

Acting roles

Q&A/stand-up releases

Jay and Silent Bob Podcast releases

Television

Music videos

Web

Video games

Audio drama

References
 General

 

 Specific

External links
 
 

Male actor filmographies
Director filmographies
Filmography
American filmographies